Novi Grad is a village in the municipality of Odžak, Bosnia and Herzegovina. It is located close to the Croatian border.

Demographics 
According to the 2013 census, its population was 362.

References

Populated places in Odžak